Pieter Rink  (13 August 1851, in Tiel – 6 August 1941, in The Hague), was a Dutch politician.

Pieter Rink was a successful lawyer in Tiel. He was a member of the Liberal Union (Liberale Unie) and served in the city council of his city of birth (1883–1905) and was a member of the States-Provincial of Gelderland (1903–1905). In 1891 he was elected in the House of Representatives (Dutch lower house of parliament) and remained a member till 1922 (except in the period 1905-1908 when he was Minister of the Interior). From July 1918 till April 1921 he was the president of the parliamentary group of the Liberal Union and from April 1921 till July 1922 he served as the first president of the Freedom League parliamentary party. In 1923 he was elected to the Senate (upper house), remaining a member till 1933. In the years prior to the introduction of universal suffrage (introduced in 1917) he was an ardent advocate of suffrage extension and was considered a "Takkiaan". This fact was underlined in the party brochure he co-authored, Het kiesrechtvraagstuk ("The Suffrage Question") which was published in 1903 and called for the introduction of universal suffrage, female suffrage and a reform of the electoral system.

Pieter Rinck joined the de Meester cabinet in 1905 as Minister of the Interior. This cabinet was very weak and incapable of introducing important reforms and it resigned in December 1907 (an earlier resignation in December 1906 was refused by Queen Wilhelmina).

After the merger of the Liberal Union and the League of Free Liberals (Bond van Vrije Liberalen) in 1921 he joined the new conservative liberal party Freedom League (Vrijheidsbond).

Pieter Rink, who belonged to the Dutch Reformed Church, died on 6 August 1941 in The Hague.

Party functions
Member of the Liberal Union till 16 April 1921
Member of the Freedom League from 16 April 1921
Member of the Party Executive of the Liberal Union between 1891 and 1915
Deputy Chairman of the Liberal Union from 1915 till 1920
Provisional Chairman of the Liberal Union from January 1917 till April 1921
Member of the Party Executive of the Liberale State Party "The Freedom League" from 16 April 1921 till 1924
Deputy Chairman of the Liberal State Party "The Freedom League" from 1925 till April 1932
Honorary Chairman of the Liberal State Party "The Freedom League"

Literature
Nederlands Patriciaat 1911, 1958

See also
List of Dutch politicians
Liberal State Party "The Freedom League"

External links

1851 births
1941 deaths
People from Tiel
Liberal Union (Netherlands) politicians
Liberal State Party politicians
Ministers of the Interior of the Netherlands
Members of the Senate (Netherlands)
Members of the House of Representatives (Netherlands)
Members of the Provincial Council of Gelderland
Municipal councillors in Gelderland
19th-century Dutch lawyers
Utrecht University alumni
Commanders of the Order of the Netherlands Lion